Lise Selnes (born 11 November 1976) is a Norwegian politician.

Hailing from Stange, Selnes worked as teacher in Nord-Odal from 1999. She was mayor in Nord-Odal from 2011 to 2021. She was elected representative to the Storting from the constituency of Hedmark for the period 2021–2025, for the Labour Party. In the Storting, she was a member of the Standing Committee on Education, Research and Church Affairs from 2021.

References

1976 births
Living people
Labour Party (Norway) politicians
Hedmark politicians
Mayors of places in Hedmark
Members of the Storting
Women members of the Storting